Safavid Government Institutions is a book about the Safavid Empire, published by Mazda Publishers, with Willem Floor as author. It contains the first detailed account of the state and army institutions and offices of the Safavid Empire.

References

Further reading
 2004 review by Ernest Tucker in Middle East Studies journal (Cambridge University Press)
 2004 review by Roger Savory in Iranian Studies (Taylor & Francis, Ltd.)
 2003 review by Charles Melville in International Journal of Middle East Studies (Cambridge University Press)
 2002 review by Rudi Matthee in Middle East Journal

2001 non-fiction books
Safavid Iran
History books about Iran